The 1993 NCAA Rifle Championships were contested at the 13th annual competition to determine the team and individual national champions of NCAA co-ed collegiate rifle shooting in the United States. The championship was hosted by the Virginia Military Institute at Kilbourne Hall in Lexington, Virginia. 

Five-time defending champions West Virginia once again retained the team championship, finishing just 10 points ahead of Alaska in the team standings. It was the Mountaineers' ninth overall national title.

The individual champions were, for the smallbore rifle, Eric Uptagrafft (West Virginia), and Trevor Gathman (West Virginia), for the air rifle.

Qualification
Since there is only one national collegiate championship for rifle shooting, all NCAA rifle programs (whether from Division I, Division II, or Division III) were eligible. A total of seven teams ultimately contested this championship.

Results
Scoring:  The championship consisted of 120 shots by each competitor in smallbore and 40 shots per competitor in air rifle.

Team title

Individual events

References

NCAA Rifle Championships
1993 in shooting sports
NCAA Rifle Championships
NCAA Rifle Championship